The 6"/40 caliber gun Mark 4 (spoken "six-inch-forty-caliber") were used for the secondary batteries of the United States Navy's  and  battleships. They were also used as the main battery on the  protected cruisers.

Design
The /40 caliber Mark 4 guns were developed before the Spanish–American War and still used black powder or brown powder, in later years they were not considered strong enough to withstand the higher chamber pressures generated by the newer smokeless powder adopted around 1898. Many were obsolete before the start of World War I, namely the Mods 0, 1, 2, 3, and 8, and were removed from service, however, since they were stronger than the earlier Mark 1, 2, and 3s, 45 of them were still in active service June 1917.

The first Mark 4, gun No. 133, was completed July 1896. Production numbers were Nos. 133–196, 260–263, and 423–426. It was the first 6-inch Navy gun designed from the beginning to use case, semi-fixed, ammunition. The gun was constructed of gun steel using a tube, jacket, and seven hoops. It was originally threaded to be mounted in the Mark 5 gun mount. Mod 0 was very similar to the Mark 3 Mod 2 but with the breech ring lengthened , the trunnion hoop removed and the barrel threaded.

Mod 1, No. 155, was of similar construction, but was  longer, only 4 hoops, and an experimental breech mechanism. Mod 2, for Mark 6, 7, and 9 gun mounts, was similar but with  cut off the breech end of the gun. Only one gun, No. 136, was modified in this way. Mod 3 was similar in construction to the Mod 1 but with its mounting threads located differently and it also had a threaded bronze sleeve. Mod 4 only differed from Mod 1 construction in adding a shoulder for a mounting yoke and with a different location for the mounting threads. Mod 5 only differed from Mod 4 in adding a muzzle bell. Mod 6 was skipped and Mod 7 was an experimental Mod 4 bored out to use bag ammunition, a 1,367 cu in chamber,  think faceplate added to the breech end, and a trunnion hoop added. With Mod 8, gun No. 161, a Mod 4 gun, a  muzzle liner and muzzle bell were used and the rifling was a uniform 1/25 instead of 0 to 1/35. Mod 9 was a Mod 4 using a tube constructed of nickel-steel instead of the normal gun-metal and again the rifling was a uniform 1/25. Mod 10 used a Mod 4 had a two-step cylindrical nickel-steel liner with the rifling changed to 0 to 1/25. Mod 11 used a Mod 4 but with only a one-step cylindrical nickel-steel liner and with a uniform 1/25 rifling. Mod 12 also used a Mod 4 with a nickel-steel liner and a 0 to 1/25 increasing twist rifling. The last Mod, Mod 13 consisted of a Mod 5 with a nickel-steel liner and the using an increasing twist rifling of 0 to 1/25.

Naval service

See also
 6"/30 caliber gun – includes 6"/40 caliber Mark 3 guns

Weapons of comparable role, performance and era
 QF 6 inch /40 naval gun British equivalent
 15 cm SK L/40 naval gun German equivalent

Notes

References

External links

 Bluejackets Manual, 1917, 4th revision: US Navy 14-inch Mark 1 gun

 

Naval guns of the United States
152 mm artillery